Carl Archer (born September 17, 1948 in Trinidad) is a retired athlete from Trinidad and Tobago who specialized in the 100 metres.

At the 1970 British Commonwealth Games he finished sixth in the 4 x 100 metres relay, together with teammates Hasely Crawford, John Mottley and Edwin Roberts. He reached the quarterfinals in both the 100 and 200 metres at the same games. He also competed at the 1968 Summer Olympics and the 1970 Central American and Caribbean Games

References
Best of Trinidad

1948 births
Living people
Trinidad and Tobago male sprinters
Athletes (track and field) at the 1968 Summer Olympics
Olympic athletes of Trinidad and Tobago
Athletes (track and field) at the 1970 British Commonwealth Games
Commonwealth Games competitors for Trinidad and Tobago